Wei Yan Tao  (born 12 February 1986) is a male table tennis player from China. He joined the Chinese National Table Tennis Team in 2003. Wei is left-handed, shakehand grip. He played for Zheshang Bank Table Tennis Club in China Table Tennis Super League in 2008 and 2009. He is the coach of Guangzhou Tianhe Taibaijinxing Table Tennis Association from 2009 till 2016.
Wei moved to New Zealand in June 2016 and became the head Coach of North Shore Table Tennis Club in Auckland from 2016 till 2018.Wei started his own brand table tennis Academy–Tornado Table Tennis Institute in January 2019 in North Shore Auckland.

Major performances

2003 North Korea Open - runner-up team

2005 Table Tennis Match in China National Games - made it through to the round of 16 in Men Singles

2006 Germany Masters - beat Lucjan Blaszczyk from Poland in group game of men singles 

2006 Sydney Invitation - champion singles and doubles

2007 Germany Masters - made it through to the round of 12 in Men Singles 

2007 China National Table Tennis Championships - bronze mixed doubles.

2008 China Table Tennis Super League - runner-up team.

2009 China Table Tennis Super League - runner-up team  

2009 Table Tennis Match in China National Games - runner-up team 

2011 China Liantong Cup Table Tennis Challenge(Guangdong) - champion singles 

2011 China National Coastal City Invitation - champion singles 

2011 China National Sports College Table Tennis Tournament - champions singles, doubles and team 

2013 Table Tennis Match in Guangzhou Employee Sports Meeting - champion singles and team 

2014 China National Public Security Table Tennis Tournament - champion singles and team

References	

Living people
Chinese male table tennis players
1986 births
Table tennis players from Hubei
People from Tianmen